The 1985 Big South Conference baseball tournament  was the postseason baseball tournament for the Big South Conference, held from May 13 through 15, 1985, at Taylor Stadium on the campus of Campbell University in Buies Creek, North Carolina.  In this, the first year of existence for the conference, four teams participated in the double-elimination tournament.  The conference was composed of teams playing at the NCAA Division I, NCAA Division II, and NAIA levels, and had yet to be certified as an NCAA Division I conference.  No automatic bids were awarded, although teams could participate in tournaments with at-large invitations.

Format
The four teams that participated were matched in a blind draw, as no conference standings were kept in the inaugural season.

Bracket and results

All-Tournament Team

Most Valuable Player
Jeff Dodig and John Posey were named co-Most Valuable Players.  Dodig was an outfielder for Winthrop and Posey was a third-baseman for Campbell.

References

Tournament
Big South Conference Baseball Tournament
Big South Conference baseball tournament
Big South Conference baseball tournament